The members of the 30th General Assembly of Newfoundland were elected in the Newfoundland general election held in November 1951. The general assembly sat from March 11, 1952 to September 10, 1956.

The Liberal Party led by Joey Smallwood formed the government.

Reginald F. Sparkes served as speaker.

There were seven sessions of the 30th General Assembly:

Sir Leonard Outerbridge served as lieutenant governor of Newfoundland.

Members of the Assembly 
The following members were elected to the assembly in 1951:

Notes:

By-elections 
By-elections were held to replace members for various reasons:

Notes:

References 

Terms of the General Assembly of Newfoundland and Labrador